Cholangiography is the imaging of the bile duct (also known as the biliary tree) by x-rays and an injection of contrast medium.


Types
There are at least four types of cholangiography:

 Percutaneous transhepatic cholangiography (PTC): Examination of liver and bile ducts by x-rays. This is accomplished by the insertion of a thin needle into the liver carrying a contrast medium to help to see blockage in liver and bile ducts.
 Endoscopic retrograde cholangiopancreatography (ERCP). Although this is a form of imaging, it is both diagnostic and therapeutic, and is often classified with surgeries rather than with imaging.
 Primary cholangiography (or perioperative): Done in the operation room during a biliary drainage intervention.
 Secondary cholangiography: Done after a biliary drainage intervention.

In both cases fluorescent fluids are used to create contrasts that make the diagnosis possible. Cholangiography has largely replaced the previously used method of intravenous cholangiography (IVC).
 Magnetic resonance cholangiopancreatography (MRCP) is another cholangiography method.

References

Projectional radiography
Hepatology
Digestive system imaging